These are the line-ups of Mizraab, a progressive rock band from Karachi, Sindh, Pakistan, formed in 1997. Founded by vocalist, lead guitarist and songwriter, Faraz Anwar, the band's initial line-up was with Faraz Anwar on vocals, Khalid Khan on bass and Akhtar Qayyum on percussions, since then there had been many changes in the line-up the only consistent member being Faraz himself.

The band is well known for being one of the few bands to have brought progressive rock music in Pakistan, thus being one of the few heavy metal music bands to receive significant acknowledgment by the press. The band earned a growing fan base in the underground music community and critical acclaim, with their debut album release Panchi in 1999 described as the first progressive rock album in Pakistan. Faraz Anwar then in 2001 recorded and released An Abstract Point of View through the record label Gnarly Geezer, owned by Allan Holdsworth. The album got rave reviews from musicians all over the world hailing Faraz as a great guitar find from Asia. In 2004, the band, fronted by Faraz, found renewed success and popularity by the release of their second studio album, Maazi, Haal, Mustaqbil, which received too much criticism and critical acclaim. The album sold more than 30,000 copies and is the band's highest selling album. Singles from the album like "Panchi" and "Kitni Sadian" received a lot of airtime on local music channels. The album is also credited to be the first proper Urdu metal album released in Pakistan.

After the release of their second studio album, Mizraab made a comeback into the lime light with the video for "Ujalon Main" in December 2006, which showcased the new band members as well as the change in genre and was well received all over the country. Mizraab’s third album was completed in late 2006-2007 but due to the dire state of the music industry in Pakistan, no deal could be reached and the album was shelved.

The following is a list of musicians who have performed in Pakistani progressive rock band Mizraab.

Current members
Faraz Anwar
Active: 1997–present
Instruments: lead vocals, lead guitar
Release contributions: Panchi (1999), Maazi, Haal, Mustaqbil (2004)
Faraz Anwar (born July 15, 1977) is a Pakistani guitarist and vocalist, known for his solo instrumental work and his band Mizraab. He has been called "Pakistan's master of progressive rock." In 6th grade he decided to pick up a guitar after seeing a video of guitar virtuoso Yngwie Malmsteen on TV. Faraz got his education from St. Paul and St. Andrews, but left after his matriculation because he wanted to pursue a career in music. At the age of 11, he won Pakistan's national music competition, and at 14 he became a full-time musician. Most of his work consisted of touring with top-tier acts and studio collaborations. One of his projects is a collaboration with Imran Raza, which combines classic rock with such Eastern musical influences as "South Asian flutes and classical Sufi singing"; according to The Weekly Standard, it was President Pervez Musharraf of Pakistan who brought the two together.

Irfan Ahmed
Active: 2002-2010, 2011–present
Instruments: drums
Release contributions: Maazi, Haal, Mustaqbil (2004)
Irfan 'Charlie' Ahmed is a Pakistani director and drummer, known for his work with, progressive rock band, Mizraab. He initially started as a session player for the band playing drums on their debut studio album Panchi (1999). In 2002, Ahmed became a permanent member of the band and played drums on the second studio album of the band Maazi, Haal, Mustaqbil (2004). In 2010, when Faraz Anwar went to pursue further education in England, Ahmed left the band. However, after a year when Faraz Anwar returned to Pakistan, Ahmed rejoined the band as its drummer once again. Irfan Ahmed along with Faraz Anwar directed the music video of the song "Woh Aur Main", released in 2007.

Muhammad Muzzamil
Active: 2011–present
Instruments: rhythm guitar, backing vocals
Release contributions: None
Muhammad Muzzamil (born July 19, 1990) is a Pakistani guitarist, known for his work with progressive rock band Mizraab. He is a former student of Faraz Anwar. Muzzamil replaced Yusuke Iwahashi on rhythm guitars in 2011.

Ferdinand Goveas
Active: 2011–present
Instruments: bass
Release contributions: None
Ferdinand Goveas is a Pakistani bassist, known for his work with progressive rock band Mizraab. Goveas has also worked with many well known mainstream bands like Strings and Raeth as a session player. Goveas has also been travelling with Strings as a live sessionist for the band and played bass for Strings in a collaborative song "Jeet Lo Dil" with Indian band Euphoria. In 2011, Goveas replaced James Hobday as the bassist of Mizraab.

Former members

Akhtar Qayyum
Active: 1997-1999
Instruments: percussion
Release contributions: Panchi (1999)

Khalid Khan
Active: 1997-2003
Instruments: bass, backing vocals
Release contributions: Panchi (1999)

Faraz Arshad
Active: 2003-2005
Instruments: bass, backing vocals
Release contributions: Maazi, Haal, Mustaqbil (2004)

Jamal Mustafa
Active: 1999-2004
Instruments: rhythm guitar
Release contributions: Maazi, Haal, Mustaqbil (2004)

Shahzad Naseem
Active: 2004-2009
Instruments: rhythm guitar, backing vocals
Release contributions: None

Rahail Siddiqui
Active: 2005-2009
Instruments: bass, backing vocals
Release contributions: None

James Hobday
Active: 2010-2011
Instruments: bass
Release contributions: None

Yusuke Iwahashi
Active: 2010-2011
Instruments: rhythm guitar
Release contributions: None

Matthew Curr
Active: 2010-2011
Instruments: drums
Release contributions: None

Timeline

Guest appearances

References

External links
 Mizraab official website

Mizraab